Le cantatrici villane (The Boorish Singers) is a comic opera (dramma giocoso) in two acts composed by Valentino Fioravanti to a libretto by Giuseppe Palomba. It was first performed in Naples in 1799. A revised one act version premiered at the Teatro San Moisè in Venice as Le virtuose ridicole in 1801. 

An opera by Antonio Cagnoni based on the same libretto and entitled Don Bucefalo premiered in Milan in 1847.

Roles
 Rosa, a peasant believed to be a widow (soprano)
 Agata, a peasant (soprano)
 Giannetta, a peasant (soprano)
 Don Bucefalo, a timid and ignorant choirmaster (bass)
 Don Marco, a well-to-do student of Don Bucefalo and in love with Rosa (bass)
 Carlino, a young soldier who has disappeared in Spain and husband of Rosa (tenor)
 Giansimone, a waiter in the local inn (tenor)

Synopsis
The action takes place in 18th century Casoria, a village near Naples.

Three country wenches (Agata, Giannetta and Rosa) have aspiration to become bel canto virtuose with the help of an ignorant choirmaster (Don Bucefalo) and another would be singer (Don Marco), but things get complicated with the unexpected return of bragging soldier and Rosa's  jealous husband (Carlino).

Discography
 Le cantatrice villane (1CD) – Alda Noni, Ester Orell, Fernanda Cadoni, Sesto Bruscantini, Franco Calabrese, Agostino Lazzari – Orchestra di Napoli, Mario Rossi – Cetra reissued by Warner-Fonit (1951)
 Le cantatrici villane (complete, 2 hours 15 minutes) Maria Angeles Peters, Giovanna Manci, Floriana Sovilla, Ernesto Palacio Orchestra Sinfonica del Licinio Refice, Roberto Tigani 2000 Bongiovanni

Notes and references

Sources
 Anderson, James (1993). The Complete Dictionary of Opera & Operetta. Wings Books. 
 
 Fornasier, Umberto, Cantatrici villane, Le, in Gelli, Piero & Poletti Filippo eds. (2007). Dizionario dell'Opera 2008, Milan: Baldini Castoldi Dalai, pp. 187–188.  
 Pessina, Marino, Don Bucefalo, in Gelli, Piero & Poletti Filippo eds. (2007), op. cit., p. 333 
 Polzonetti, Pierpaolo (2011). Italian Opera in the Age of the American Revolution. Cambridge University Press.

External links
 Libretto
 Vocal scores for two arias from Le cantatrici villane at the International Music Score Library Project

1799 operas
Operas
Italian-language operas
Opera buffa
Operas set in Naples